"Nuestro Amor Será Leyenda" (English: "Our Love Will Be Legend") is a song recorded by the Spanish singer-songwriter Alejandro Sanz. It was released as the third single from his eighth studio album Paraíso Express (2009).  The song was released for digital download on April 12, 2010.

Song information

Nuestro Amor Será Leyenda is the third single of Sanz's eighth studio album, Paraíso Express. This song is written by Alejandro Sanz himself alongside Puerto Rican producer, singer, and songwriter, Tommy Torres. 

Lyrics of the song shows that how much Sanz loves his love but he's far from her, one of the best quotes about this is "Desde lejos yo te quiero con el fuego", which means "I love you like fire form afar".

Music video
A music video, directed by Alejandro Toledo, was shot in 2010 in Spain. Toledo worked with Sanz before on El Alma al Aire music video.

Chart performance

Weekly charts

References

External links
"Nuestro Amor Será Leyenda" Lyrics

2010 singles
2009 songs
Spanish-language songs
Alejandro Sanz songs
Songs written by Alejandro Sanz
Songs written by Tommy Torres
2000s ballads
Pop ballads
Warner Music Latina singles